Modibo or more correctlyMoodibbo in Fula or Fulfulde Orthography is a given name in some Fulɓe or Fulani regions, while in some regions it's used as a form of respect which means a learned scholar. Others are named moodibbo after one's parents or grand parents. Notable people with the given name include:

Modibo Keïta (1915–1977), Malian politician
Modibo Keita (born 1942), Malian politician 
Modibo Maïga (born 1987), Malian footballer
Modibo Nama Traoré, Malian journalist and military personnel
Modibo Sidibé (born 1952), Malian politician
Modibo Tounty Guindo, Malian judge magistrate